Elizabeth Prinsloo is a paralympic swimmer from South Africa competing mainly in category S10 events.

Elizabeth competed in both the 1996 and 2000 Summer Paralympics.  In 1996 she won a bronze medal in the 50m freestyle, as well as finishing fifth in the 100m freestyle, sixth in the 100m butterfly but was disqualified in the heat of the 100m backstroke.  In the 2000 games she finished fourth in the 50m freestyle, 100m freestyle and 100m backstroke and finished seventh in the 400m freestyle.

References

External links
 

Paralympic swimmers of South Africa
Swimmers at the 1996 Summer Paralympics
Paralympic bronze medalists for South Africa
South African female freestyle swimmers
Living people
Medalists at the 1996 Summer Paralympics
Year of birth missing (living people)
Paralympic medalists in swimming
South African female butterfly swimmers
South African female backstroke swimmers
S10-classified Paralympic swimmers
20th-century South African women
21st-century South African women